Beceni is a commune in Buzău County, Muntenia, Romania. It is composed of nine villages: Arbănași, Beceni, Cărpiniștea, Dogari, Florești, Gura Dimienii, Izvoru Dulce, Mărgăriți and Valea Părului.

Natives
Constantin Constantinescu-Claps (1884–1961), general during World War II

Notes

Communes in Buzău County
Localities in Muntenia